Sean Skelton (born 28 September 1971) is a former South Africa international rugby league footballer who represented South Africa in the 2000 Rugby League World Cup.

Playing career
In 1987, Skelton played for the Nowra Warriors in the Group 7 Rugby League competition.

Skelton joined the Canterbury-Bankstown Bulldogs in 1989, Skelton captained the under-21s in 1990 and played ten NSWRL Premiership games between 1991 and 1992. He joined the South Sydney Rabbitohs in 1993.

In 1995, Skelton played for the Illawarra Steelers.

Skelton played three matches for South Africa between 1997 and 2000. Skelton played one match at the 2000 World Cup before breaking his hand.

References

1971 births
Living people
Australian people of South African descent
Australian rugby league players
Canterbury-Bankstown Bulldogs players
Illawarra Steelers players
Place of birth missing (living people)
Rugby league hookers
South Africa national rugby league team captains
South Africa national rugby league team players
South Sydney Rabbitohs players